The Piramal Group is an Indian multinational conglomerate that has presence across various sectors such as healthcare, life sciences, drug discovery, financial services, alternative investment and real estate.

History

In the early 1980s, Ajay Piramal took over the reins of Piramal Group. In 1984, the group acquired Gujarat Glass Limited, a manufacturer of glass packaging for pharmaceutical and cosmetic products, followed by Ceylon Glass in 1999. 
 
In 1988, the group bought Nicholas Laboratories, which later flourished and by 2010 reached the highest valuation in the pharmaceutical industry. Over the decade, the company acquired many business units to strengthen their presence.
 
In 1999, Piramal Glass acquired Ceylon Company Limited, Sri Lanka.

In 2006, the company bought Pfizer’s UK manufacturing facility in Morpeth. The company also formed the Piramal Foundation, a philanthropic arm of the group.

In 2007, it underwent a deal with Merck Pharmaceuticals for development and discovery of new drugs. 
In 2008, it signed a second drug development deal with Eli Lilly and Company.
The company Nicholas Laboratories was renamed to Piramal Healthcare Ltd.

In 2010, Piramal Healthcare sold its domestic formulations business to Abbott for $3.72 billion (about 18,000 crore). It was considered to the "most expensive pharma deal ever" by Forbes India. Piramal Healthcare then sold its diagnostics chain Piramal Diagnostic Services to SRL for 600 crore. In the same year, the group formed its own real estate entity, Piramal Realty.

2011 saw Fortune 500 ranking Piramal Healthcare in the top-50 largest corporations across India. UN Conference on Trade and Development’s World Investment Report 2011 ranked Piramal Healthcare as No. 5 in the top 10 pharmaceutical contract manufacturers worldwide. In 2011–12, Piramal bought 11% in Vodafone Essar. In 2014, it sold its 11% Stake in Vodafone India to Prime Metals, an indirect subsidiary of Vodafone Group. In 2012, Piramal Healthcare was renamed to Piramal Enterprises Ltd.
BST-CarGel, Piramal's innovative bio-orthopaedic product for cartilage repair, received European CE mark approval.
Piramal's Decision Resources Group acquired Abacus International, a UK based company.

Piramal Enterprises acquired the brand Caladryl in India. Caladryl is an anti-pruritic solution known for dermatosis application for minor skin irritations and itching. This acquisition enabled Piramal Enterprises to widen its consumer products portfolio in the skin care segment.

Piramal Imaging entered into a Strategic Partnership and Exclusive Licensing Agreement with Ci-Co Healthcare for Commercialization of florbetaben F18.

European Union’s CHMP recommends EU approval of Piramal Imaging’s radiopharmaceutical NeuraCeq (florbetaben 18F).

In December 2020, Piramal Glass was sold to The Blackstone Group for 1 billion.

Group companies

The Piramal Group comprises 3 key companies: Piramal Enterprises Ltd, Piramal Pharma Ltd and Piramal Realty. Piramal Enterprises and Piramal Pharma are listed at both Bombay Stock Exchange and National Stock Exchange.

Piramal Enterprises
Piramal Enterprises Limited is the flagship company of Piramal Group, and active in financial services. Piramal Enterprises is involved in retail lending, housing finance and vehicle financing. It has two main subsidiaries viz., Piramal Capital & Housing Finance (PCHFL) and PHL Fininvest. It also holds minority stakes in Shriram Group companies.

In 2021, Piramal acquired the bankrupt Dewan Housing Finance Corporation and merged it with PCHFL. PCHFL's retail finance division provides microlending and buy now, pay later services on behalf of partner fintech companies like ZestMoney, MoneyView, EarlySalary, Navi Group and KreditBee, and is also engaged in vehicle financing for partner companies like CARS24, CarDekho and Spinny. Apart from retail finance, it is also involved in corporate lending and real estate finance.

Since 2016, Piramal Enterprises and Bain Capital Credit have been operating a partnership called India Resurgence Fund (IndiaRF), an investment fund for financially distressed Indian companies. Piramal Capital Fund (PCF), a partnership between Piramal Enterprises and CDPQ that was started in 2020, provides corporate financing services. Both IndiaRF and PCF are managed by Piramal Alternatives, an asset management company set up by Piramal Enterprises in 2021.

Piramal Pharma
Piramal Pharma Limited is active in business verticals including pharmaceuticals, healthcare and life sciences. Its business divisions include Piramal Pharma Solutions, a contract development and manufacturing organization; Piramal Critical Care, a manufacturer of inhalational anesthetics and other hospital generics; and Piramal Consumer Products Division, an over-the-counter consumer healthcare products business. Piramal Pharma Limited was demerged from Piramal Enterprises in 2022.

Piramal Pharma's subsidiaries include Hemmo Pharmaceuticals and Convergence Chemicals. It also has a joint venture with Allergan in the ophthalmology products segment.

Piramal Realty

Piramal Realty is a fully owned real estate venture of Piramal Group. The company is planning to develop about 30 million square feet through land acquisitions from its own sources. The group developed a mall in, Cross Roads, at South Mumbai.

Piramal Foundation

The Piramal Foundation is a private philanthropic foundation established in 2006. Piramal Foundation has undertaken projects like Piramal Swasthya (a health information help line service called Arogya Vani in the state of Karnataka), Sarvajal  (provides clean water in India through solar powered water ATMs), source for change  (rural BPO for rural youth in Bagar, Rajasthan), Pratham  (delivers education to under privileged children), Piramal foundation for education leadership (Piramal Fellowship and Principal Leadership Development program (PLDP) are the two programs undertaken) and Piramal Prize  (recognizes emerging ventures and established organizations).

See also
 Piramal Glass

References

External links

Health care companies of India
Holding companies of India
Real estate companies of India
Companies based in Mumbai
Indian companies established in 1984
Conglomerate companies established in 1984
Holding companies established in 1984
Real estate companies established in 1984
Warburg Pincus companies
Piramal Group
1984 establishments in Maharashtra